Kandula may refer to:

 Kandula (elephant), a famous war elephant
 Kandula Mallikarjuna Rao, a popular Indian music composer and singer
 Kandula Palem is a village located in Ramachandrapuram mandal in Andhra Pradesh